Aliyor Devlokhovich Ashurmamadov (born on 20 August 1970) is a Tajikistani football coach and a former player who played for FC Lokomotiv Moscow, FC Anzhi Makhachkala, and FC Irtysh. He is the manager of Regar-TadAZ Tursunzoda. He was a member of the Tajikistan national football team.

Career

Managerial
On 23 January 2018, Panjshir appointed Ashurmamadov as their manager.

Career statistics

International

International goals

Honours
Pamir Dushanbe
Tajik League (1): 1992
Tajik Cup (1): 1992

Varzob Dushanbe
Tajik League (2): 1999, 2000
Tajik Cup (1): 1999

References

External links

1970 births
People from Khatlon Region
Living people
Soviet footballers
Tajikistani footballers
Tajikistani expatriate footballers
Tajikistan international footballers
CSKA Pamir Dushanbe players
FC Lokomotiv Moscow players
FC Anzhi Makhachkala players
Expatriate footballers in Kazakhstan
Tajikistani expatriate sportspeople in Kazakhstan
Expatriate footballers in Russia
Soviet Top League players
Russian Premier League players
Vakhsh Qurghonteppa players
Association football forwards
Tajikistan Higher League players
CSKA Pamir Dushanbe managers
Tajikistani football managers